Sir Walter Barttelot, 1st Baronet,  (10 October 1820 – 2 February 1893) was a Conservative Party politician in the United Kingdom who served as Member of Parliament for several constituencies.

Life
A member of an ancient Sussex family, Barttelot was the son of George Barttelot and his wife Emma (née Woodbridge). He was educated at Rugby School and then served in the 1st Royal Dragoons, purchasing his captaincy on 7 February 1845. After retirement from the army he raised the 6th (Petworth) Sussex Rifle Volunteer Corps on 15 February 1860 and was promoted to major to command the 2nd Administrative Battalion, Sussex Rifle Volunteer Corps on 26 April 1860. He continued to command the 2nd Sussex Rifle Volunteers until he became its Honorary Colonel in 1882.

In December 1860 he was elected as a Member of Parliament for West Sussex, which he served until 1885 when he became member for Horsham, serving until his death. Horsham's Barttelot Road off the Brighton Road was named after him. Sussex Police Headquarters was located there and current photographs of Barttelot Road are featured (Hidden Horsham). Barttelot was created a baronet, of Stopham in the County of Sussex, on 14 June 1875, and made a Companion of the Order of the Bath in 1880. In 1892 he was admitted to the Privy Council.

He became a director of the London, Brighton and South Coast Railway in August 1864, and served as its chairman from April to July 1867.

Barttelot married firstly Harriet, daughter of Sir Christopher Musgrave, 9th Baronet, in 1852. They had two sons and five daughters, including Dame Edith Sclater. After his first wife's death in 1863 he married secondly Margaret, daughter of Henry Boldero, in 1868. They had no children. Lady Barttelot died in January 1893. Barttelot survived her by only a few days and died in early February 1893, aged 72. He was succeeded in the baronetcy by his eldest son Walter.

See also 
 Barttelot baronets
 Sir Walter George Barttelot, 2nd Baronet
 Sir Walter Balfour Barttelot, 3rd Baronet

References

External links 
 

1820 births
1893 deaths
Baronets in the Baronetage of the United Kingdom
Conservative Party (UK) MPs for English constituencies
Companions of the Order of the Bath
Members of the Privy Council of the United Kingdom
UK MPs 1859–1865
UK MPs 1865–1868
UK MPs 1868–1874
UK MPs 1874–1880
UK MPs 1880–1885
UK MPs 1885–1886
UK MPs 1886–1892
UK MPs 1892–1895
Deputy Lieutenants of Suffolk
1st The Royal Dragoons officers
London, Brighton and South Coast Railway people